A seasonal industry is activity within an economic sector in which the majority of operations take place during only part of the year, usually within a period of half a year or less.

In some cases, as with agriculture, this limitation may relate to climate or other forces of nature. In others, the seasonality may relate to annual variations in human activity (for example, tourism, restaurants, some forms of manufacturing).

Seasonal industries often feature large swings in labor force size, and in many cases, precipitate mass migrations of workers.

In those countries that provide them, unemployment benefits may be affected by a worker's seasonal status. That is, in certain cases, a seasonal worker may not be considered "unemployed" during the off-season for the sake of benefits or aggregated statistics, despite being functionally inactive.

See also
Seasonworker

Notes 

Industries (economics)